The Waome was a passenger steamer that sank on Lake Muskoka on 6 October 1934. Three people died when she sank.

References

Maritime incidents in 1934
1912 ships